GPDF is an acronym for:
 Gambela People’s Democratic Front, a former political party in Ethiopia (1998–2003).
 Gurage People’s Democratic Front, a political party in Ethiopia
 PDF viewer for GNOME
 Generalized probability density function